Gergely Kálló (born January 9, 1985) is a Hungarian politician. He is a member of National Assembly of Hungary (Országgyűlés) since May 8, 2011. He is a member of the Jobbik.

References 

Living people
1985 births
Hungarian politicians
21st-century Hungarian politicians
Members of the National Assembly of Hungary (2018–2022)
Jobbik politicians